This is a list of the albums ranked number one Top Gospel Albums in the United States during 2017. The top-performing albums and EPs in the United States for gospel are ranked on the Billboard Top Gospel Albums chart, which is published by Billboard magazine. The data is compiled by Nielsen SoundScan based on each album's weekly physical and digital sales, as well as on-demand streaming and digital sales of their individual tracks.

In 2017, a total of 21 albums claimed the top position of the chart. Beginning with gospel powerhouse Tamela Mann’s One Way, One Way by Tamala Mann was the best-selling Top Gospel album of 2027, spending eleven weeks atop the chart and was the best-performing album on the Billboard Top Gospel Album Year-End chart of 2017 continuing the success of the album from 2016, issue dated January 14th,

In this year, several acts had spent multiple weeks at number-one: Tasha Cobbs Leonard with Heart. Passion. Pursuit, WOW Gospel 2017 both spent eight weeks at top.  while Emcee N.I.C.E.’s debut Christian Hip Hop album Praise and James Fortune’s "Dear Future Me" both spent three weeks at the top. Marvin Sapp with Close, Anthony Brown & Group Therapy with "A Long Way from Sunday" and Travis Greene with The Hill Crossover: Live from Music City each spent two weeks at the top of the charts.

Chart history

References

Gospel 2017
United States Gospel